Bukhara State University, Bukhara State University named after Fayzulla Khodjayev, is a higher educational institution in Bukhara, Uzbekistan that trains scientific and pedagogical personnel.

History

It was founded on the basis of the Decree of the President of the Republic of Uzbekistan on March 15, 1992 based on Bukhara Pedagogical Institute which was founded in 1930.

There are 9 faculties (physics, economics, chemistry, agriculture, art graphics and folk applied art, history, foreign languages, pedagogy and physical culture, Uzbek philology), a social learning center, 50 specialized departments, regional language center, specialized academic lyceum, gymnasium, preparation courses, library (with rare manuscripts and lithographs), botanical garden, planetarium, computing center, test center, university history Archaeological sites, museums, trainings, sports training, sports complexes, educational and educational work clubs (2001). There are 23 specializations in the department. There are postgraduate, master's and doctorates. In the 2000/2001 academic year, more than 5,000 students were trained, 341 teachers, including 1 academician of the Academy of Sciences of Uzbekistan, 28 doctors and professors, 272 candidates of sciences and associate professors. There are scientific researches in different areas such as Russia, Italy, Ireland, France, MAP, Poland, Germany and the United States. Since its inception, the University has trained more than 25,000 professionals (2001).Future Doctor Education Services is Portal For Admission in Bukhara State University for Foreigner Students.

Rectors of Bukhara State University 
 Vahabov Karimjon. 1930-1931
 Usmonov G’anijon. 1931-1934
 Valiyev X.X. 1934-1935
 Rajabov D. 1935-1936
 Tereshxanov G.X. 1937-1938
 Rustamov Agzam. 1938-1940
 Sbizova Anna Ivanovna. 1940
 Davlat - Yusupov Mustafo Xasanovich. 1940-1943
 Hamidov (Homidiy) Sharif Hamidovich. 1944-1948
 Jo’rayev Turob Jo’rayevich. 1948-1950
 Maqsudov Sh.T. 1951-1955
 Yakubov R. 1955-1957
 Rahmatov Muxtor Ne’matovich. 1957-1960
 Namozov Juma Namozovich. 1960-1977
 Jabborov Narimon Ibragimovich. 1977-1979
 Mo’minov Vafo Arabovich. 1979-1986
 Qosimov Farhod Habibovich. 1986-1992
 Muqimov Komil Muqimovich. 1992-2005
 Yoriyev Oltin Muzaffarovich. 2005-2009
 Tadjixodjayev Zokirxo’ja. 2010-2014
 Tulaganov Abdukabil Abdunabiyevich. 2014-2018
 Xamidov Obidjon Xafizovich 2018--present

References

External links

Universities in Uzbekistan